George Lockie (18 February 1910 – 2 November 1971) was an Australian cricketer. He played in four first-class matches for Queensland in 1945/46.

See also
 List of Queensland first-class cricketers

References

External links
 

1910 births
1971 deaths
Australian cricketers
Queensland cricketers
Cricketers from Queensland